Typhlogammaridae is a family of amphipods belonging to the order Amphipoda.

Genera:
 Accubogammarus Karaman, 1974
 Adaugammarus Sidorov, Gontcharov & Sharina, 2015
 Metohia Absolon, 1927
 Typhlogammarus Schäferna, 1907
 Zenkevitchia Birstein, 1940

References

Amphipoda
Crustacean families